The men's 100m freestyle S9 event at the 2008 Summer Paralympics took place at the Beijing National Aquatics Center on 8 September. There were three heats; the swimmers with the eight fastest times advanced to the final.

Results

Heats
Competed from 10:58.

Heat 1

Heat 2

Heat 3

Final
Competed at 20:22.

 
Q = qualified for final. WR = World Record. PR = Paralympic Record.

References
 
 

Swimming at the 2008 Summer Paralympics